Litoboř is a municipality and village in Náchod District in the Hradec Králové Region of the Czech Republic. It has about 100 inhabitants.

Geography
It lies in the Giant Mountains Foothills. The village is situated along the Hluboký Stream, which springs here.

Economy
The municipality has primarily been a leisure destination in recent decades. Less than 40% of dwellings are continuously occupied; the other houses are primarily utilised for individual recreation.

References

Villages in Náchod District